Carl Froch vs. Glen Johnson was a championship fight for the WBC Super Middleweight championship.  The winner of the bout went on to the Finals of the Super Six World Boxing Classic and face WBA Champion Andre Ward, after his decision win over Arthur Abraham in May 2011. It was held on June 4, 2011, at Boardwalk Hall, in Atlantic City, New Jersey, United States, and televised on Showtime.

Build Up

Carl Froch 
Froch defeated Andre Dirrell by split decision in a WBC super-middleweight title defense. A very controversial win who many believed Dirrell had won. Nevertheless, Froch got the win and the 2 points for his victory. In his second bout of the Super Six, the contestant was Danish boxer Mikkel Kessler. 31-year-old  Kessler managed to take the WBC super-middleweight title from defending champ Carl in a great action fight that had some truly memorable trading, especially in the later rounds, Kessler prevailed via a unanimous decision. After the loss, Froch's next fight would be against rugged fighter Arthur Abraham. He regained his WBC Title as he dominated from start to finish to claim a unanimous point victory over Abraham in Helsinki, Finland.

Glen Johnson 
Former light heavyweight champion Johnson joined the Super Six World Boxing Classic when he replaced the injured Mikkel Kessler. Johnson, 41, has not fought at super middleweight since 2000, but dropped down to the 168-pound weight class to face, and beat, Allan Green in a Group Stage 3 bout on November 6 to advance to Semi Finals and gain 3 points for the knockout. The fight took place at the MGM Grand in Las Vegas on the undercard of the Juan Manuel Lopez vs. Rafael Marquez Featherweight title fight.

Fight Card

Televised bout
Super Middleweight Championship bout:   Carl Froch vs.  Glen Johnson
Froch defeated Johnson via majority decision (116-112, 117-111, 114-114).

Untelevised bouts
 Light Heavyweight bout:  Edison Miranda vs.  Rayco Saunders
Miranda defeated Saunders via unanimous decision (80-73 , 79-73, 79-73).

 Light Heavyweight bout:  Zsolt Erdei vs.  Byron Mitchell
Erdei defeated Mitchell via technical knockout at 1:58 in the sixth round.

 Light Welterweight bout:  Ivan Redkach vs.  Alberto Amaro
Redkach defeated Amaro via technical knockout at 1:46 in the sixth round.

 Light Heavyweight bout:  Badou Jack vs.  Hajro Sujak
Jack defeated Sujak via technical knockout in the fifth round.

 Middleweight bout:  J'Leon Love vs.  Lamar Harris
Love defeated Harris via unanimous decision (40-35, 40-35, 40-35).

Showtime broadcast
As part of the television broadcast, Showtime featured former super middleweight champion and former Super Six participant Mikkel Kessler in a comeback bout against Mehdi Bouadla.  Kessler won by way of TKO in the sixth round, ending a 14-month layoff.  The bout was for the vacant WBO European super middleweight title.

References

External links
Froch vs. Johnson Official Fight Card from BoxRec

2011 in boxing
2011 in sports in New Jersey
June 2011 sports events in the United States
Boxing matches at Boardwalk Hall